Lecanographaceae is a family of mostly lichens (also some lichenicolous fungi) in the order Arthoniales. The family was circumscribed in 2014, prompted by a molecular phylogenetic-based restructuring of the Arthoniales.

Description
Lecanographaceae species have a crustose thallus, and lack a cortex. Their photobiont partners are a green algae in the family Trentepohliaceae. The ascomata are narrow and furrowed (lirelliform) to rounded, and there is no margin around the thallus. The hymenial disc is often exposed, and is often pruinose. The excipulum (a layer of sterile tissue that contains the hymenium) is conspicuous, dark brown, usually closed, without a thalline margin. Interascal filaments are branched or anastomosed. The asci (spore-bearing cells) are cylindrical to club shaped. The ascospores are hyaline, spindle shaped (fusiform), and feature distosepta–thin septa of ascospores that lack a septal plate and are penetrated by cytoplasmic junctions. The cells divide in two equal parts during the spore septation.

Genera
Alyxoria  (1821) – 12 spp.
Heterocyphelium  (1927) – 2 spp.
Lecanographa  (1994) – ca. 40 spp.
Mixtoconidium  (1995) – 2 spp.
Phacographa  (2009) – 3 spp.
Plectocarpon  (1825) – ca. 40 spp.
Zwackhia  (1855) – 6 spp.

References

Arthoniomycetes
Ascomycota families
Lichen families
Taxa described in 2014